Nemastoma is a genus of arachnids belonging to the family Nemastomatidae.

The species of this genus are found in Europe and Northern America.

Species:
 Nemastoma acrospinosum Roewer, 1951 
 Nemastoma aeginum Roewer, 1951

References

Harvestman genera
Harvestmen